T. Moor was a Tyneside singer/songwriter of the 19th century. The only song attributed to his name is "The Skipper's Dream".

Life 
Even less is known about Moor than many of his counterparts, the only information available coming from a brief item in Allan’s Tyneside Songs

Mr Moor, not even his Christian name is known, was a shoemaker who had a business in Denton Chare, Newcastle. He was a good bass singer and sang in the choir of St. Andrew's Church, Newcastle upon Tyne.
Moor was the writer of "The Skipper's Dream", an anti-papal song, written in a Geordie dialect, which tells of the dream of a local skipper, with caustic comments about the forgiving of sins for money. This is the only song attributed to our Mr Moor, who would often sing the song.

Collections 
The song first appeared in The Newcastle Songster, a chapbook published by J. Marshall,  Old Flesh Market, Newcastle upon Tyne c1824. 
The song appears later in the Tyne Songster, a choice selection of songs in the Newcastle dialect – a 72-page booklet printed and sold by W. Orange, North Shields in 1827. (No author's name given in this edition). In the later (1840) edition printed and sold by W & T Fordyce of Newcastle, T. Moor is given as the writer.

See also 
Geordie dialect words

References

External links
 FARNE-Folk Archive Resource North East–The Skipper’s Dream
Allan’s Illustrated Edition of Tyneside songs and readings 1891

English singers
English songwriters
People from Newcastle upon Tyne (district)
Musicians from Tyne and Wear
Geordie songwriters